The 2003 Slovak Cup Final, was the final match of the 2002–03 Slovak Cup, the 34th season of the top cup competition in Slovak football. The match was played at the Vojtech Schottert Stadium in Topoľčany on 8 May 2003 between ŠK Slovan Bratislava and FK Matador Púchov. Matador Púchov defeated Slovan Bratislava 2-1.

Route to the final

Match

Details

References

Slovak Cup Finals
Slovak Cup
Cup Final